The costovertebral joints are the joints that connect the ribs to the vertebral column. The articulation of the head of the rib connects the head of the rib to the bodies of the thoracic vertebrae.

Structure
The costotransverse joint connects the tubercle of the rib with the transverse process of the thoracic vertebrae. It is a synovial joint.

Two convex facets from the head attach to two adjacent vertebrae, at the inferior costal facet of the superior vertebra, and the superior costal facet of the inferior vertebra respectively. This forms the synovial planar (gliding) joint, the articulation of the head of rib, which is strengthened by the ligament of the head and the intercapital ligament. Articulation of the tubercle is to the transverse process of the inferior vertebra. This articulation is reinforced by the dorsal costotransverse ligament.

The intra-articular ligament of head of rib (interarticular in older texts; ligamentum capitis costae intraarticulare) is situated in the interior of the articulation of head of rib between the superior costal facet and the inferior costal facet. It consists of a short ligament, a band of fibers, flattened from top to bottom, attached at one end to the crest separating the two costal facets on the head of the rib, and at the other end to the intervertebral disc between the two vertebrae; it divides the joint into two cavities. This ligament is the homologue of the conjugate ligament present in some mammals, and uniting the heads of opposite ribs, across the back of the intervertebral fibrocartilage.

In the joints of the first, tenth, eleventh, and twelfth ribs, the intra-articular ligament does not exist; consequently, there is only one cavity in each of these articulations.

Function 
The costovertebral joints stabilise the ribs by connection to the vertebral column.

Other animals 
The costovertebral joints are very similar in other mammals, including cats.

References

External links 
 Diagram at ithaca.edu via web.archive.org

Joints